In enzymology, a mannose-1-phosphate guanylyltransferase is an enzyme that catalyzes the chemical reaction

GTP + alpha-D-mannose 1-phosphate  diphosphate + GDP-mannose

Thus, the two substrates of this enzyme are GTP and alpha-D-mannose 1-phosphate, whereas its two products are diphosphate and GDP-mannose.

This enzyme belongs to the family of transferases, specifically those transferring phosphorus-containing nucleotide groups (nucleotidyltransferases).  The systematic name of this enzyme class is GTP:alpha-D-mannose-1-phosphate guanylyltransferase. Other names in common use include GTP-mannose-1-phosphate guanylyltransferase, PIM-GMP (phosphomannose isomerase-guanosine 5'-diphospho-D-mannose, pyrophosphorylase), GDP-mannose pyrophosphorylase, guanosine 5'-diphospho-D-mannose pyrophosphorylase, guanosine diphosphomannose pyrophosphorylase, guanosine triphosphate-mannose 1-phosphate guanylyltransferase, and mannose 1-phosphate guanylyltransferase (guanosine triphosphate).  This enzyme participates in fructose and mannose metabolism.

Structural studies

As of late 2007, only one structure has been solved for this class of enzymes, with the PDB accession code .

References

 
 

EC 2.7.7
Enzymes of known structure